Benito Ormenese ( 3 March 1930 – 18 July 2013) was an Italian kinetic artist.

Biography 
Ben Ormenese was born in Prata di Pordenone, Province of Pordenone, in 1930. In 1960 he left the faculty of architecture and went to live in Milan where his career started.

Through the gallery owner Silvano Falchi in Milan, Ben Ormenese, was able to show his work in various solo exhibitions in Italy and Germany, and in other exhibitions for example at the Royal Academy of Arts in London, as well as at modern art shows in Switzerland and Germany.

The work 
His artworks are recognizable by the "geometrical and three-dimensional aspects he incorporates into them."

References

External links 
 SAST REPORT Culture: Biography, Photos, Video

1930 births
2013 deaths
People from the Province of Pordenone
Italian artists